The  of Japan is one ranking system for Shinto shrines. The system was established during the Heian period and formed part of the government's systematization of Shinto during the emergence of a general anti-Chinese sentiment and the suppression of the Taoist religion. It involved the establishment of the shrines as important centers of public life in Japan. It played a role in official imperial ceremonies such as the Practice of Chinkon. An extensive body of literature also emerged containing information about each shrine, including the shrine's origin, priestly dress, divine treatises, the system of shrine removal, subordinate shrines, and annual cycle of rituals, among others. 

By the year 806, 4,870 households were assigned to Shinto shrines while the government provided a national endowment for their upkeep. These shrines also received special offerings from the Imperial Court. As time progressed, this offering to the shrines was amended so that Imperial envoys were only sent to the powerful shrines in Kyoto, which was the capital of Japan at the time. This amendment initially identified fourteen shrines but it was increased to twenty-two in 1081. There are historians who explained that the majority in list involved those with central lineages supporting the imperial house, sites of cults that gained popular significance, and shrines in locations with the presence of Buddhist institutions.

Establishment

In 965, Emperor Murakami ordered that Imperial messengers were sent to report important events to the guardian kami of Japan. These heihaku were presented to 16 shrines: 1. Ise; 2. Iwashimizu; 3. Kamo; 4. Matsunoo; 5. Hirano; 6. Inari; 7. Kasuga; 8. Oharano; 9. Miwa; 10: Isonokami; 11. Ōyamato; 12. Hirose; 13. Tatsuta; 14. Sumiyoshi; 15. Nibu and 16. Kibune.

In 991, Emperor Ichijō added three more shrines to Murakami's list—17. Yoshida; 18. Hirota; and 19. Kitano; and two more were added three years later in 994;—20. Umenomiya; and 21. Gion.

In 1039, Emperor Go-Suzaku ordered that one more shrine be added to this list, 22. Hie, and this unique number of Imperial-designated shrines has not been altered since that time.

Near the end of the Heian period, there was a movement to add Itsukushima Shrine to the list, but it did not happen. However, until the end of the Muromachi period, the Imperial Court made offerings to it, and in the Edo period, offerings were again made after disasters occurred.

List of shrines

When the Nijūni-sha are considered as a grouped set, they are conventionally presented in order of rank, not in terms of the  chronological sequence in which they were designated.  The three rank ranked groupings originally derived from a complex array of Heian geopolitical relationships.

Upper Seven Shrines

Middle Seven Shrines

Lower Eight Shrines

Note: At the time when the Nijunisha were chosen, the current Niukawakami Nakasha was the only Niukawakami Shrine. It became the middle shrine (nakasha) only after the shrine in Shimoichi and Kawakami were united with it.

See also

Ichinomiya
List of Jingū
List of Shinto shrines

Notes

References
 Breen, John and Mark Teeuwen. (2000).  Shinto in History: Ways of the Kami. Honolulu: University of Hawaii Press. 
 Ponsonby-Fane, Richard. (1962).   Studies in Shinto and Shrines. Kyoto: Ponsonby Memorial Society. OCLC 399449

Shinto shrines in Japan